Cangas is a Spanish Denominación de Origen Protegida (DOP), traditionally called a Vino de calidad con Indicación Geográficafor wines located in the autonomous region of Asturias. This is one step below the mainstream Denominación de Origen quality wines and one step above the less stringent Vino de la Tierra wines on the quality ladder.

The area covered by this geographical indication comprises the following municipalities in Asturias: Cangas del Narcea, Allande, Grandas de Salime, Illano, Pesoz and Ibias.

It acquired its Vino de la Tierra status in 2001 and its Vino de Calidad status in 2009.

Authorised Grape Varieties
The authorised grape varieties are:

 Red: Garnacha Tintorera, Mencía, and Verdejo Negro are preferred; also authorised are Albarín Negro, Carrasquín, Merlot, Pinot Noir, and Syrah

 White: Albarín blanco, Albillo, and Picapoll Blanco are preferred; also authorised are Godello, Gewürztraminer, Moscatel de Grado Menudo

References

External links
 D.O.P. Cangas official website

Wine regions of Spain
Spanish wine
Appellations
Wine classification
Biscay